Much, the Miller's Son is one of the Merry Men in the tales of Robin Hood. He appears in some of the oldest ballads, A Gest of Robyn Hode and Robin Hood and the Monk, as one of the company.

History
In A Gest of Robyn Hode, he helps capture Richard at the Lee, and when Robin lends that knight money to pay off his debts, he is one of the Merry Men who insist on giving him a horse and clothing appropriate to his station. In Robin Hood and the Monk, he is one of the rescuers of the captive Robin. In this brutal ballad, Moche kills a page boy so the boy cannot bear word that the outlaws killed the monk of the title. He then disguises himself as the page and Little John disguises himself as the monk. The implication that Much is of small stature is not made explicit.

In other tales, he was known as Midge, the Miller's Son, the name by which he is known in Robin Hood and the Curtal Friar and Robin Hood and Queen Katherine (version 145B). It is also the name used by Howard Pyle for the character in his Merry Adventures of Robin Hood. This is in further contrast to the ballad Robin Hood and Allan-a-Dale where he is known as Nick, the Miller's Son.

In the 1991 movie Robin Hood: Prince of Thieves (starring Kevin Costner), a character resembling Much in many respects is the young boy named Wulf. Another character named Much, the Miller's Son does appear in the movie (played by Jack Wild), but he has very little screen time. In the earlier tales, however, Much is slightly older and takes a much more physical role. Indeed, he is a formidable fighter. Much is present from the very earliest Robin Hood ballads in which he often accompanies Little John.

Appearances in other media

Herbert Mundin portrayed Much in the 1938 Errol Flynn version The Adventures of Robin Hood.
Much has a notable role in the television series Robin of Sherwood (1984–86) in which he is Robin's adopted brother (a role given to Will Scarlet in some versions). In the series, he is played by Peter Llewellyn Williams and portrayed as somewhat mentally lacking, needing Robin to look after him. His killing a deer without thinking of the consequences led to them becoming outlaws. In the anime series Robin Hood no Daibōken, Much (voiced by Mayumi Tanaka) is a child and Little John's right-hand man as part of a group of bandits who were forced to hide out in Sherwood Forest to avoid forced labour.

In the British 1991 adaptation Robin Hood, the character is played by Danny Webb and credited as Mulch the Miller. 

In the children's comedy Maid Marian and Her Merry Men (1989–94), the character is parodied as a "wide boy" (one who lives by wit and guile) called Much the Mini-Mart Manager's Son.

Much plays a somewhat minor role in the PC game Conquests of the Longbow: The Legend of Robin Hood, where during times when Robin Hood consults his men for tactical advice, Much almost always provides the worst plan with the least chance of success. His plans are often outlandish, with no real basis in tactics, which fits well with his character's background of a poor, talentless outlaw of a miller's son.

Much is the main character in a Xeric award-winning webcomic, Much the Miller's Son by Steve LeCouilliard. This comedy series loosely follows the legend of Robin Hood (drawing heavily from the Errol Flynn version) from the point of view of Much.

In the play Marian: or the True Tale of Robin Hood by Adam Szymkowicz, Much appears as a member of the band of thieves, originally addressed as Much the Miller’s Son. After showing discomfort to the group being referred to as the Merry Men, Much comes out as nonbinary. This leads to them being referred to as Much the Miller's Kid and the band of thieves calling themselves "Robin Hood and his Merry Men- and Much!"

BBC series 
Much is also a major character in the BBC television series Robin Hood (2006–2009), but he is no longer a miller's son; in the second episode, he claims to have no family at all. Instead, he is Robin's former manservant, comrade-in-arms, and best friend from the Third Crusade, who has been given his freedom as a result of his services there, but finds himself outlawed with Robin upon their return home. In this version, he is the gang's cook and immensely loyal to Robin; he is often seen to be jealous of the attention Robin gives to others, especially Marian.
In the series, Much was played by Sam Troughton, grandson of Patrick Troughton, the first actor to play Robin Hood on British television.

The role of Much as a cook has some literary precedent in J. Walker McSpadden's Stories of Robin Hood and His Merry Outlaws (1904). In this collection of Robin Hood tales, Much (who is still the son of a miller) is living in the household of the Sheriff of Nottingham and serving as his cook until he meets Robin and Little John and joins the Merry Men. He is portrayed as a "stout man and bold" and a highly skilled swordsman.

References

English outlaws
Merry Men
Robin Hood characters